Roko Karanušić chose not to defend his 2009 title.
Alex Bogdanovic won this tournament, after Ivan Dodig disqualification in the final (when the result was 3–6, 7–6(7)).

Seeds

Draw

Finals

Top half

Bottom half

References

 Main Draw
 Qualifying Draw

Kobstaedernes ATP Challenger - Singles